Jean Rousselle (born 18 April 1953) is a Canadian politician, who was member of the National Assembly of Quebec from 2012 to 2022. First elected in the 2012 election,  he represented the riding of Vimont as a member of the Quebec Liberal Party.

Election results

|}  2014 Elections Quebec reference:

|}

References

External links
 

1953 births
Living people
Quebec Liberal Party MNAs
Politicians from Laval, Quebec
Politicians from Montreal
21st-century Canadian politicians